Joya may refer to:

 Joyà, a Cirque du Soleil show in Riviera Maya, Mexico
 Joya (album), a 1997 album by Will Oldham
 Joya (drink), a Mexican fruit soda brand owned by The Coca-Cola Company
 Joya (singer), a R&B singer
 Joya, India, a town in Uttar Pradesh, India
 Joya Maria Azzi (born 2000), Lebanese footballer
 Joya Sherrill, American jazz vocalist and children's television host
 Malalai Joya, Afghan politician
 Sara Joya, Peruvian volleyball player 

Feminine given names